Tapio may refer to:

Tapio (given name), a Finnish male given name
Tapio (surname), a Finnish surname
Tapio (spirit), a god or spirit in Eastern Finnish mythology
Tapiola, one of the major urban centres within the city of Espoo, outside of Helsinki
Tapiola, Michigan, an unincorporated community in Houghton County, Michigan, United States
Tapiola, a symphonic poem by Jean Sibelius that was one of his last compositions
Tápió, the name of a stream in Hungary. See Hydrography of Hungary